Every year on Lag BaOmer, some 200,000 people flock to the 'Yom Hillula' (day of rejoicing) at the tomb of Rabbi Shimon bar Yochai in Meron, Israel. The highlight of the event is the traditional bonfire lit after nightfall on the roof of the tomb, after which celebration with music and dancing begins. From the 13th century onwards, the site became the most popular Jewish pilgrimage site in all of Israel, the celebration first being mentioned by an Italian traveller in 1322.  Today it forms the largest mass annual event in Israel.

Customs

Bonfires

The custom symbolises the "spiritual light" brought in to the world by Rabbi Shimon bar Yochai, to whom the Zohar is ascribed. At the tomb of Rabbi Shimon, the honour of lighting the main bonfire traditionally goes to the Rebbes of the Boyaner dynasty. This privilege was purchased by Rabbi Avrohom Yaakov Friedman of Sadigura from the Sephardi guardians of Meron and Safed. He bequeathed the honour to his eldest son, Rabbi Yitzchok Friedman of Boyan and his progeny. The first  (lighting) is attended by hundreds of thousands of people annually; in 2001, the crowd was estimated at 300,000. In 2018, 18 different Hassidic Rebbes took turns leading the festivities surrounded by their followers.

An account published in 1848 describes how vast numbers of Jews would arrive at the tomb to celebrate the anniversary of Rabbi Shimon's death. It relates that over the tombs of each of the three rabbis buried in the compound was a cupola and a piller about 3 ft high which had a hollow scooped out which would hold about 80 pints of oil each. The privilege to set the oil ablaze was sold to the highest bidder, who would use a "costly shawl or richly ornamented dress" to ignite it. "The Jews remain here for 3 days and nights, praying, and reading, and feasting. The money thus obtained, which amounts to a large sum, is employed to keep the building in repair."

Chai rotel
A custom observed during the Hillula is the free distribution of drinks. The Hebrew word chai is the numerical equivalent of 18.  is a liquid measure of about 3 liters. Thus, 18 rotels equals 54 liters (about 13 gallons). This practice was endorsed by Rabbi Ovadia miBartenura and The Shelah HaKadosh. The Bobover Rebbe, Rabbi Ben Zion Halberstam, sent a letter from Poland to his Hasidim in Israel asking them to donate  in Meron on this holy day on behalf of a couple that did not have children. Nine months after , the Ohel Rashbi organization even invites couples who prayed at the tomb and had a child to come back to Meron to celebrate the births.

Upsherin

It is customary at the Meron celebrations, dating from the time of Rabbi Isaac Luria, that three-year-old boys be given their first haircuts, while their parents distribute wine and sweets. Similar  celebrations are simultaneously held in Jerusalem at the grave of Shimon Hatzaddik for Jerusalemites who cannot travel to Meron.

Torah procession
In a tradition started in 1833, on the afternoon preceding Lag Baomer, a Torah scroll belonging to the descendants of Rabbi Shmuel Abu is carried on foot from their home in Safed to the tomb.

Attendance
The gathering has been described as a display of Jewish unity, with all different types of Jews attending, Ashkenazim and Sephardim, religious and secular.

In 2018, the crowd was estimated in excess of 250,000 with 5,000 police officers deployed. The event was allocated $4m in funding by the Ministry for Religious Affairs. 
Organizers said they would be supplying 100,000 liters of cold water and juice and offering parve food which they claimed most pilgrims preferred, (half of the 500 litres of prepared cholent was meatless).

Various government bodies, such as the Ministry of Religions and the Israel Police, prepare for it while investing resources in maintaining order at the event and facilitating traffic to the site. An extensive array of thousands of shuttles is used with more than 1,000 buses bringing the celebrants from all over Israel, making it the largest annual public transportation event in Israel.

Safety concerns
A 2008 report by the State Comptroller of Israel deemed the site inadequate to cater for the large number of annual visitors and a 2016 police report warned of issues with infrastructure and crowd control. An attempt by the state to take control over the site in 2011 to address health and safety concerns was met with anger by the private trusts operating the site and a court approved settlement in 2020 ruled that control would remain with the owners.

Incidents
Every year, many people are injured due to over-crowding. On May 15, 1911, a crowd of about 10,000 filled the compound. A railing of a nearby balcony collapsed with about 100 people falling from a height of roughly 7m to the ground, resulting in the deaths of 11 people and 40 injured. On April 30, 2021, with about 100,000 people in attendance, a deadly crush occurred in which 45 people were killed and more than 150 injured.

Gallery

See also 
 Yom Hillula

References

Further reading

Bension, Ariel. "The Hilulah of Simeon ben Jochai (as it is celebrated today)". The Zohar in Moslem and Christian Spain. Routledge (2016; first published 1932). Part III After the Exile - XIII: pg. 216-223. 
Schwartz, Yael. (Ed. Rivka Gonen) "The Hillula of Rabbi Shimon bar Yohai at Meron." To The Tombs of the Righteous: Pilgrimage in Contemporary Israel. Israel Museum (1999). pg. 46-59. 

Galilee
Jewish holy days
Jewish pilgrimages
Lag BaOmer